The Coral Sea stingaree (Urolophus piperatus) is a little-known species of stingray in the family Urolophidae, found at a depth of  around the edge of the continental shelf off northern Queensland. Its tail bears a low dorsal fin before the stinging spine and terminates in a short leaf-shaped caudal fin. Its upper surface is grayish or brownish, sometimes with tiny dark spots. The Coral Sea stingaree may represent two closely similar species, one large and one small. There is very little fishing activity within its range, and thus it has been listed under Least Concern by the International Union for Conservation of Nature (IUCN).

Taxonomy
The first known specimens of the Coral Sea stingaree were collected during a series of exploratory research cruises conducted by France and Australia in the 1980s. It was known provisionally as Urolophis "sp. B" before being described by Bernard Séret and Peter Last in a 2003 issue of the scientific journal Cybium. Its specific epithet is derived from the Latin piper ("pepper"), in reference to its spotted pattern. The sandyback stingaree (U. bucculentus) and the patchwork stingaree (U. flavomosaicus) are close relatives of this species.

Distribution and habitat
Endemic to northern Queensland, the range of the Coral Sea stingaree extends from Moreton Island northward to Cairns, and encompasses the Saumarez and Marion Reefs.

Description
The Coral Sea stingaree has a diamond-shaped pectoral fin disc 113–121% wider than long, with nearly straight leading margins and rounded outer corners. The tip of the fleshy, triangular snout protrudes past the disc. The eyes are rather large, and are followed by teardrop-shaped spiracles with rounded to angular posterior rims. There is a skirt-shaped flap of skin between the nostrils, with a weakly fringed posterior margin whose corners are extended into small lobes. The medium is of medium size and contains 7–9 papillae (nipple-like structures) on the floor; the 5–7 papillae in the middle may have multiple tips. The lower jaw also bears a patch of minute papillae. The teeth number 32–35 rows in the upper jaw and 30–39 in the lower jaw, and are small with roughly rhomboid bases. The five pairs of gill slits are short. The pelvic fins are small and rounded posteriorly; males have blunt claspers.

The tail measures 76–85% as long as the disc and is flattened at the base; there may be a subtle skin fold running along each side. A serrated stinging spine is placed atop the tail about halfway along its length, with a low dorsal fin just in front. The tail ends in a short, deep, leaf-shaped caudal fin. The skin is devoid of dermal denticles. Rays found in the Coral Sea are generally light gray or brown above with tiny dark dots, while those off Queensland tend to be darker brown above and unpatterned. The dorsal and caudal fins are brown with blackish margins. Juveniles are usually more densely spotted than adults, and have a dark stripe along the dorsal midline of the tail. The underside is white, sometimes with dusky lateral disc margins and/or a few dark blotches on the tail.

Biology and ecology
Virtually nothing is known of the natural history of the Coral Sea stingaree. It is presumably aplacental viviparous like other stingrays, with developing embryos provisioned with maternally produced histotroph ("uterine milk"). The disparity between the maturation size and the maximum size is usually large for a cartilaginous fish, and it is possible that the specimens currently identified as the Coral Sea stingaree actually represent distinct species, one large and one small. However, the presumed large and small forms cannot be distinguished by morphological or meristic traits.

Human interactions
Because fishery activity is insignificant within the range of the Coral Sea stingaree, it has been listed under Least Concern by the International Union for Conservation of Nature (IUCN). It would potentially benefit from the implementation of the 2004 Australian National Plan of Action for the Conservation and Management of Sharks.

References

Urolophus
Fish of Australia
Taxonomy articles created by Polbot
Taxa named by Bernard Séret
Taxa named by Peter R. Last
Fish described in 2003